Ondrej Lenárd (9 September 1942, Korompa, Hungary [now Krompacy, Slovakia]) is a Slovak conductor. He was principal conductor of the Czecho-Slovak Radio Symphony Orchestra from 1977 to 1990 and of the Slovak Philharmonic Orchestra from 1991 to 2001, where his concert work included performances of Ján Levoslav Bella's Wieland der Schmied.  His recordings include a Marco Polo issue of the Symphony No. 1 of Havergal Brian, and a Naxos recording of the complete Nutcracker. In 2019, he became chief conductor for the Slovak Radio Symphony Orchestra.

Discography
 Eugen Suchoň: Krútňava
 Antonín Dvořák: Symphony No. 9 "New World" (1988, Gold Fidelity, Pacific Music Co., Ltd.)
 Pavol Habera: Svet lásku má (1996, Polygram)
 Pyotr Ilyich Tchaikovsky: Swan Lake (1989 Naxos)

References

1942 births
Living people
Slovak conductors (music)
Male conductors (music)
21st-century conductors (music)
21st-century male musicians